The Stand at Apache River is a 1953 American Western film directed by Lee Sholem and starring Stephen McNally, Julie Adams and Hugh Marlowe.

Plot

Cast
 Stephen McNally as Lane Dakota  
 Julie Adams as Valerie Kendrick (as Julia Adams)
 Hugh Marlowe as Colonel Morsby  
 Jaclynne Greene as Ann Kenyon  
 Hugh O'Brian as Tom Kenyon  
 Russell Johnson as Greiner  
 Jack Kelly as Hatcher  
 Edgar Barrier as Cara Blanca  
 Forrest Lewis as Deadhorse

References

Bibliography
 Gene Blottner. Universal-International Westerns, 1947-1963: The Complete Filmography. McFarland, 2000.

External links
 
 
 

1953 films
1953 Western (genre) films
American Western (genre) films
Films directed by Lee Sholem
Universal Pictures films
Films scored by Frank Skinner
1950s English-language films
1950s American films